Encuentro Oceanía is a super-regional mall in the Venustiano Carranza borough of Mexico City, around 5 km east of the Zócalo. It is located along the main thoroughfare, Avenida Oceanía, around 1 km west of the Circuito Interior inner ring highway, and around 2 km west of Terminal 1 of the Mexico City International Airport. It is across the street from Romero Rubio metro station. 

Anchor stores include the first IKEA store in Mexico, which opened in April 2021.

Other anchors include Chedraui hypermarkets, Cinemex multicinemas, Energy Fitness, and Forever 21. The center as a whole held its soft launch in October, 2021. There is a total of over 200 stores and  leasable area. The center cost around 1.5 billion Mexican pesos to build, according to its spokesman.

Gallery

References

Shopping malls in Greater Mexico City
Venustiano Carranza, Mexico City